The following is a list of rugby league players that made international or county appearances while playing for Broughton Rangers.

International

England
 Jack Beetham (1908)
 Billy Bentham (1922–26)
 George Bunter (1940)
 Bert Cambridge (1935)
 Jim Clampitt (1909–14)
 James Cumberbatch (1937)
 Jack Flynn (1908)
 Jack Garvey (1936)
 Andy Hogg (1908)
 Stan McCormick (1948)
 Bob Poole (1905)
 Jack Price (1921)
 Billy Stott (1936)
 Ernie Thompson (1936)
 Bob Wilson (1905)

Great Britain
 Billy Bentham (1924)
 Jim Clampitt (1908–14)
 Elwyn Gwyther (1947–51)
 Andy Hogg (1908)
 Stan McCormick (1948–49)
 Doug Phillips (1950)
 Jack Price (1921)
 Ray Price (1952)
 George Ruddick (1908–10)

Other nationalities
 Andy Hogg (1906)
 Sam James (1905–06)
 Willie James (1906)
 Jim Scott (1905)

Wales
 Elwyn Gwyther (1947–51)
 Glyn Jones (1946)
 Ned Jones (1913)
 Doug Phillips (1947–51)
 Ray Price (1948–52)
 George Ruddick (1908–11)
 Melbourne Tierney (1953)
 Frank Whitcombe (1938)

County

Cumberland
 Jack Beetham (1902–03)
 John Benn (1904–05)
 Hilderick Bouch (1910–11)
 Bob Clampitt (1909–19)
 Jim Clampitt (1906–19)
 George Davidson (1910–20)
 Billy Doran (1929)
 Jack Flynn (1907–10)
 Joe Hall (1909)
 Ned Hodgson (1938–45)
 E. G. Morrison (1923–24)
 J. H. Templeton (1904)
 Jim Trotter (1907)
 Billy Winskill (1905–19)

Durham and Northumberland
 J. H. Jewitt (1903)

Glamorgan
 Dai Davies (1927)

Lancashire
 Eric Ayles (1952–53)
 Jim Barnes (1922)
 Jack Beetham (1906–12)
 Billy Bentham (1920–24)
 George Berry (1896)
 Harry Chapman (1895–98)
 Tom Cleminson (1895–97)
 Jim Cumberbatch (1935–36)
 Dick Duck (1898)
 Jack Fearnley (1946)
 Jack Garvey (1936)
 Billy Harris (1912)
 Frank Harry (1904–06)
 Andy Hogg (1902–08)
 Bill Hunt (1951)
 Alex Hurst (1921)
 Sam James (1902–06)
 Willie James (1901–06)
 W. J. Larkin (1920)
 Stan McCormick (1947–48)
 Billy McGarrigan (1932)
 George Messenger (1896–98)
 Joe Nelson (1897–98)
 Bill Oram (1902–03)
 Bob Poole (1904–06)
 Jack Price (1919–22)
 W. Robinson (1896)
 George Ruddick (1901–08)
 G. Steel (1897–98)
 Charlie Thompson (1899–1900)
 Jim Trotter (1904–05)
 George Whitehead (1897–1902)
 Alf Wild (1911)
 Bob Wilson (1901–07)

Yorkshire
 Billy Stott (1933–38)
 Ernie Thompson (1937)

Rugby union representatives

England
 Arthur Royle (1889)
 Robert Seddon (1887)
 Alfred Teggin (1884–87)

Lancashire
 Jack Hacking (1895)
 Johnny Robertson (1882–88)
 Arthur Royle (1888–89)
 Robert Seddon (1884–87)
 Sam Simpson (1886)
 Alfred Teggin (1883–87)
 Jack Tune (1886–89)
 R. R. Veale (1888)

North of England
 Arthur Royle (1888–89)
 Robert Seddon (1885–86)
 Alfred Teggin (1883–86)

References
 

Broughton Rangers players
Broughton